Pinkster is a spring festival, taking place in late May or early June. The name is a variation of the Dutch word Pinksteren, meaning "Pentecost". Pinkster in English almost always refers to the festivals held by African Americans (both free and enslaved) in the Northeastern United States, particularly in the early 19th century. To the Dutch, Pinkster was a religious holiday, a chance to rest, gather and celebrate religious services like baptisms and confirmations. It also had a long tradition as a day of dance and merriment. For their enslaved Africans, Pinkster was a time free from work and a chance to gather and catch up with family and friends.
 
Pentecost is a Christian feast falling on the seventh Sunday after Easter, in remembrance of the descent of the Holy Spirit, in the guise of flames, upon the apostles at the "Feast of the Harvest" (Ex. 23:16), also known as Whitsunday, enabling the apostles to spread the news of Christ in all languages, (glossolalia or the "gift of tongues") (Acts 2).

Pinksteren was also a celebration of the change of the seasons and of spring renewal. Various customs are intended to invoke the growth and fertility of fields and pastures. These include, for example, setting up Pentecost trees (pinksterkroon), that have the same origin as the maypoles. In many places inhabitants decorate village fountains with flowers and birch branches to which they attach colorful ribbons and chains of colored eggs.

In North America
Dutch colonists and settlers in present-day New York State and New Jersey brought the celebration of Pinkster to North America in the 17th century. However, by the 19th century, Pinkster had evolved into a primarily African-American holiday, celebrated by slaves and free blacks, and liberally seasoned with African culture and traditions.

In contrast to the Southern plantations, the great majority of Northern farm families owned few slaves. With the less hospitable climate and less hospitable natives, farms in the north were much smaller; therefore, (except in the larger cities, once they grew) Africans were fewer and farther apart. Family members were sold down the road to other families. Pinkster was a chance for the Africans to meet up and catch up with family and friends, to taste some temporary independence, and a chance to make and spend a little money of their own. It also provided the opportunity to share, express and pass on African culture and tradition, especially to those African Americans born in North America.

In New York, families traveled from the outlying areas into New York City or Albany, which remained a largely Dutch city into the early 19th century.  There they could meet up with the significantly larger population of slaves and African freemen.  By the mid-18th century, celebrations in New York and Brooklyn attracted very large gatherings.  African Americans sold berries, herbs, sassafras bark, beverages, and oysters, and they used the money they earned at the Pinkster festival. Today the Pinkster festival in Albany, New York, remains to be the oldest African American music festival in the United States.

The celebration of Pinkster
Pinkster was celebrated over several days. The Dutch observed Pinkster by attending church services and holding important church functions such as baptisms and confirmations.  Neighbors, freed from work, visited with one another while the children painted eggs in vibrant colours and indulged in sweets like gingerbread.

Africans and Dutch also enjoyed drinking, games, dance and music during the Pinkster holidays. Sellers decorated their stalls and carts with greenery and flowers, especially azaleas, which were associated with Pentecost, and sellers would hire skillful African dancers to attract attention to their stalls. Their dances were combinations of African and European steps and elements, creating new dances that were precursors to modern tap and break dancing.

To different people, Pinkster signified different things. Pinkster was a religious holiday, a day off from work, and a day for socializing for Dutch people. The celebration was all of these things and more for slaves who gathered in rural areas or at urban markets. Men and women in Africa earned money, experienced a brief period of independence, and made purchases. More significantly, Pinkster meant the possibility to reconcile with family and friends as well as the chance to maintain, alter, and express African customs in spite of the limitations imposed by slavery. 
 
John Williams, a formerly enslaved man from Albany, argued in the late nineteenth century that "'Pinkster Day' was in Africa a religious day, partly pagan and partly Christian like our Christmas day. Many of the old Colored people, then in Albany, were born in Africa and would dance their wild dances and sing in their native language."  In Albany, "'Pinkster' festivities took place usually in May, and lasted an entire week. It was…the Carnival of the African Race, in which they indulged in unrestrained merriment and revelry." "The dancing music was peculiar. The main instrument was a sort of 'kettle-drum,' a wooden article called an eel-pot, with a sheepskin drawn tightly over one end."

Pinskter reached its pinnacle as an African-American holiday in Albany between 1790 and 1810; the holiday was set up on three sides of a square on the top of Pinkster Hill. During this period King Charles directed the Pinkster festival. King Charles was a local celebrity amongst African Ameircans in Albany, they praised the renowned figure. His title of Master of Ceremonies, gave hime the responsibility of keeping the spirits of the participants during the live drumming and dancing performances that commemorated during the celebration. Although Pinskter caught the attention of other ethnicities by the early 1800s it was viewed as a Afro-centric holiday.

Pinkster King
During the late 18th and early 19th centuries, the festival was presided over by a "King", who was himself a slave.  The crowning of the Pinkster King recalled elections of leaders in some African cultures of Northeastern North America, investing respected members of the slave community with symbolic power over the whole community and honor within the slave community.  This kind of celebration, inverting rank, recalls African and European traditions like Boxing Day and Mardi Gras. This tradition may have its roots in the Pentecost celebrations in the Kingdom of Kongo under the reign of Afonso I of Kongo.

One well-known "king" in Albany was "Charley of Pinkster Hill", the "King of the Blacks." Charley was born in Angola, said to be of royal blood, and became the servant of Volkert P. Douw, a wealthy merchant. "King Charles" dressed in the costume of a British Brigadier, a long scarlet coat with gold lace and yellow buckskin accessories, and a three-cornered hat. Charley and his followers, decorated with "pinkster blummies" (azaleas), led a parade up Albany's State Street. Following the parade "the negroes made merry with games and feasting, all paying homage to the king, who was held in awe and reverence as an African prince. In the evening there was a grand dance, led by Charles and some sable beauty."

Impact on African-Americans
Pinkster as an African-American celebration reached its height in New York between 1790 and 1810. Before the holiday, temporary shelters were built, frequently based on styles imitating African shelters. The festival could continue for three to four days, including sports, dance, and music. The highlight was the Toto or the Guinea dance, performed to the beating of drums.

While Enslaved Africans no doubt looked forward to Pinkster for the break from their daily drudgery and the socializing, it does not minimize the horrors of their Enslavement.

Race-based legislation
Some time between 1811 and 1813 despite or perhaps because of its popularity, the city of Albany, New York passed a city ordinance banning the drinking and dancing associated with Pinkster.  Whites were concerned that the congregation and socialization of large groups of African Americans could provide them with the opportunity to plot or plan revolution. Some historians believe the council wanted to eliminate Pinkster because it didn't appeal to the burgeoning middle class, pointing to the fact that the law was eventually overturned, which would contradict the motivation of preventing uprisings. This law was only repealed in 2011.

Albert James Williams Myers, professor of Black Studies at the State University of New York at New Paltz remarks, "I think that political officials in Albany and elsewhere within New York felt that since Pinkster was a gathering for Africans that perhaps it could lead to a revolt and so I think it was really fear of the possibility that something like this could happen that we have to bring it to an end.  So for all intents and purposes Pinkster is a memory, at least the way it was celebrated along the Hudson before 1811."

In modern times
Since the 1970s, efforts have been made to resurrect Pinkster in New York, such as at Philipsburg Manor House, an 18th-century living history museum located in Sleepy Hollow, New York, once the central location for milling and mercantile operations in the Hudson Valley.  Every Spring, Philipsburg Manor recreates an authentic celebration of Pinkster in North America, combining both Dutch and African traditions. In Albany, New York Pinksterfest has been incorporated into the city's annual Tulip Festival, celebrated on Mother's Day.

For guests of all ages, Djembes and Dance—which includes a recreation of a colonial Pinkster festival—is a delightful and instructive experience. The occasion recognizes both slavery's tyranny in New York and its final defeat. With more than a century's worth of Hudson Valley Pinkster celebrations combined, it is the only true Pinkster recreation in North America. Children's games like ninepins and stilts, holiday-specific baked products, egg-dyeing, and European-style country dance all derive from Dutch culture. A spectacular parade, storytelling, drumming, dance, and the selection of a Pinkster King all stem from African custom. The Philipses, affluent Dutch merchants, held the Upper Mills property at Philipsburg Manor, which at the time covered more than 50,000 acres. There year-round dwelt a community of 23 enslaved Africans who ran a grist mill and a sizable farm. The Philipses leased out manor property to European tenants, many of whom were Dutch, who planted wheat as a cash crop. We don't know if the African and Dutch inhabitants of the manor attended one of the larger neighboring metropolitan festivals or hosted their own Pinkster celebrations in Philipsburg throughout the 1700s. 

Pinkster is still recognized as an official holiday in The Netherlands, though many of the early types of celebrations are no longer in fashion, rendering the long weekend more just a basic holiday for all.

An early scene in Kaitlyn Greenidge's historical novel Libertie (Algonquin Books, 2021) is set during a Pinkster celebration in New York.

See also
Historic Hudson Valley
Juneteenth
Kwanzaa

External links 
Virtual Pinkster Celebration: Music of Pinkster With Chief Baba Neil Clarke and Co.

References

External links
 
 
 

Pentecost
African-American cultural history
Angolan-American history
Colonial United States (Dutch)
African-American events
Observances in New York City
Culture of Albany, New York